"There's a Skeeter on My Peter (Whack it Off)" is a well-known humorous song. It is sung to the tune of "If You're Happy and You Know It" or sometimes "She'll Be Coming Round the Mountain". The premise of this song is that the mosquito is on the singer's penis  ("peter") and he would like someone to cause the insect to depart from his appendage.  

This song has been commercially recorded by John Valby and by an anonymous person on the 1960 LP The Unexpurgated Folk Songs of Men.

Lyric variations
This song, like many in its genre, has frequently variable lyrics, including substituting "whack it off" with "beat it off" “flick it off” or "knock it off". A popular version goes like this:

There's a skeeter on my peter, whack it off!
There's a skeeter on my peter, whack it off!
There's a dozen on my cousin, I can hear them bastards buzzin';
There's a skeeter on my peter, whack it off!

Some regional variations of the third line include: 

"There's a skeeter on my peter, if you catch 'er - you can eat 'er" 

"It's a-chomping and a-chewing on the tool I use for screwing" 

"There's another on my mother and another on my brother"

References

Drinking songs